Genes (season 3) is a 2018 Indian Tamil-language game show telecast on Zee Tamil. The third season of the Genes game show was launched on 17 June 2018. The show is currently hosted by Priya Raman replacing fellow actress Roja who previously hosted the first two editions of the game show. Priya Raman has been hired as the presenter of the third season of Genes game show while she was shooting for the Zee Tamizh TV series Sembaruthi.

Rules 
The third season similar to that of the Genes season 2 has four interesting rounds 1+1=3, Yaar Indha Star?, Anniyan and Vai Raaja Vai. The participants will be presented with a basic cash prize of 100,000 just prior to the beginning of the round one which would be either get reduced or multiplied relying upon the performance of the contestants in each level.

Guests included

References

External links
 Genes 3 at ZEE5
 

Zee Tamil original programming
2018 Tamil-language television series debuts
Tamil-language game shows
Tamil-language children's television series
Tamil-language television shows
2018 Tamil-language television seasons
Television shows set in Tamil Nadu
2021 Tamil-language television series endings